Pietro Fiorini (1539, Bologna - 1629, Bologna) was an Italian architect. In his youth he studied in Rome, Parma, Florence and Milan, but his most notable works are in his home city, such as the churches of San Mattia, San Nicolò di San Felice, Sant'Isaia and San Barbaziano and the Palazzo Dondini Ghiselli.

1539 births
1629 deaths
Architects from Bologna
16th-century Italian architects
17th-century Italian architects